George Uhrie (often misspelled Uhrl and also spelled as Uhri) (October 21, 1838 – September 28, 1911) was a United States Army soldier and a recipient of America's highest military decoration, the Medal of Honor.

Early life and military service
George Uhri was born on October 21, 1838, in Baden, Germany to and Mary Uhri. He came to the United States in 1855. 

On February 9, 1856, at the age of 17, he joined the Army in New York and was assigned to Battery G, 2nd US Artillery and served during the Seminole Indian War in Florida from 1856 to 1857, and later in 1857 and 1858 against the Crows and Sioux in Minnesota. He became a citizen of the United States of America on December 15, 1860.

Civil War service
In 1860 he was assigned as a sergeant with Light Battery F, 3rd US Artillery and was transferred in 1861 to Light Battery F, 5th Regiment, US Artillery and served until 1865.

During the war, he participated in the following battles: Lee's Mills, Virginia, Gelding's Farm, White Oak Swamp, Virginia, Malvern Hill, Virginia - 1862; South Mountain, Antietam, Maryland, Fredericksburg, Virginia - 1862, Chancellorsville, Virginia, Rappahannock Station, Virginia, Gettysburg, Pennsylvania - 1863; siege of Petersburg, Virginia, Chapin's Farm, Virginia - 1864; siege and capture of Richmond, Virginia from 1864 to 1865.

Medal of Honor action
At the Battle of White Oak Swamp on June 30, 1862, while serving with the Light Battery F, 5th U.S. Artillery, was in a party of three that protected a field gun, belonging to another battery that was deserted by its officers and men. For his conduct on this occasion, he was awarded the Medal of Honor on April 4, 1898.

Uhri's official Medal of Honor citation reads:
Was 1 of a party of 3 who, under heavy fire of advancing enemy, voluntarily secured and saved from capture a field gun belonging to another battery, and which had been deserted by its officers and men. .

On December 12, 1874, while Uhri was stationed at Fort Adams in Newport, Rhode Island, Uhri's son, Franklin A. Uhri, died at Fort Adams and was buried in the fort's cemetery.

Later career
George Uhri retired from the Army on December 31, 1886.  He then served as a New York City police officer from 1893 to 1904. On February 11, 1904, he requested to be relieved the force and was granted an annual pension of $500.00. In 1905, he was living at 43 West 42nd Street, New York, New York.

Family
George Uhri was married at Richmond, Virginia on October 8, 1866 to Caroline Lena Ernst. Caroline was born in Virginia. The couple had seven children, Franklin, Joseph, Richard, Edward, William, George and Arthur. Two of his sons, Arthur (b 1869) and Edward Henry Uhri, were born in Rhode Island. George E. was born about 1869 in Washington, DC.  Franklin, Richard, William and Joseph's birthplaces are not known. Edward was born on July 9, 1875 and died in Florida.  His godfather was financier J.P. Morgan.

Death
Uhri died on September 28, 1911, at 3:20 a.m., from a brain concussion at age 73. On October 7, 1911, a letter from the War Department was sent to the mayor of New York City requesting confirmation of the date, place and cause of Uhri's death.  George Uhri was buried in the Lutheran Cemetery, Middle Village, New York on October 1, 1911. 

His widow died on September 13, 1914 of acute bronchial pneumonia in New York City and was buried beside her husband.

References 

1838 births
1911 deaths
People from the Grand Duchy of Baden
German emigrants to the United States
Military personnel from New York City
People of New York (state) in the American Civil War
Union Army soldiers
United States Army Medal of Honor recipients
German-born Medal of Honor recipients
American Civil War recipients of the Medal of Honor
Military personnel from Baden-Württemberg
People from Baden